"Bananas for Betty" is the tenth episode in the second season, and the 33rd episode overall, of the American dramedy series Ugly Betty, which aired on December 6, 2007. The episode was written by Tracy Poust and Jon Kinnally and directed by Michael Spiller. The episode is the last appearance of Alan Dale on the series.

Plot
A video message recorded by Bradford for Alexis and Daniel specifying who will run Meade Publications causes conflict between the siblings after a technical error prevents them from finding out who, so they decide to settle it out in a paintball war. Slater is having trouble getting off the ground due to lack of financial support and Wilhelmina's insistence on looking younger. Hilda sets up her own beauty salon with help from Gio and Henry, but after Betty hears Gio's romantic approach to how he would spend his last days with someone, she begins to think she and Henry are not doing enough with their time left together.

Reception
In a review from Zap2it, Hanh Nguyen welcome the comedic elements back to the show: "Ugly Betty gets past the grimness of Bradford's death to return to a more cheerful, wackier time. Alexis and Daniel get their sibling rivalry on, Betty and Henry go on a double date with Hilda and Gio and Wilhelmina tries to change her cutthroat image in order to woo investors. Oh yeah, and a Golden Girl!"

At the same time, there was criticism over the product placement for "27 Dresses".

Ratings
The episode was seen by 9.3 million in the United States and scored a 6.4 rating/10 share and placed 26th in the December 3rd-9th, 2007 nielsens.

Surprisingly in Chicago, the episode (which aired on ABC O&O WLS-TV) managed to beat an NFL game between the Chicago Bears and the Washington Redskins that was airing on WPWR-TV.

References

Also starring
Max Greenfield as Nick Pepper
John Cho as Kenny
Freddy Rodriguez as Giovanni "Gio" Rossi
Alec Mapa as Suzuki St. Pierre

Guest stars
Betty White as herself
Ted Lyde as Security guard
Ian Gregory as Bradford's attorney
Patrick Cavanaugh as Morgue director

Ugly Betty (season 2) episodes
2007 American television episodes
Paintball-related media